Dahleh (also Romanized as Dahlah and Dehleh; also known as Alīf, Dahli, and Dehlī) is a village in Kamaraj Rural District, Kamaraj and Konartakhteh District, Kazerun County, Fars Province, Iran. At the 2006 census, its population was 253, in 55 families.

References 

Populated places in Kazerun County